Pedro dos Reis  is an East Timorese politician. He is the incumbent Minister of Agriculture and Fisheries, serving since June 2020 under the VIII Constitutional Government of East Timor led by Taur Matan Ruak.

Reis is a member of the Kmanek Haburas Unidade Nasional Timor Oan (KHUNTO) political party; in March 2020, he was elected as its third Vice President.

References

External links 

Agriculture ministers of East Timor
Kmanek Haburas Unidade Nasional Timor Oan politicians
Government ministers of East Timor
Living people
Year of birth missing (living people)

21st-century East Timorese politicians